The Cooperative Institute for Climate Science (CICS) fosters research collaborations between the National Oceanic and Atmospheric Administration (NOAA)/Office of Oceanic and Atmospheric Research (OAR) Geophysical Fluid Dynamics Laboratory (GFDL) and  the Princeton University. It is one of 16 NOAA Cooperative Institutes (CIs).

The CICS research themes are:
 Earth system studies
 Biogeochemistry
 Coastal processes
 Paleoclimate

References

External links
 

Office of Oceanic and Atmospheric Research
Research institutes in the United States
Climatological research organizations
Earth science research institutes